Saint-Séverin-en-Condroz is a village and district of the municipality of Nandrin, located in the province of Liège in Wallonia, Belgium.

The village grew up around a Cluniac priory, formed in 1091. The priory was later ceded to the Prince-Bishopric of Liège and later the Jesuits, before being suppressed in 1773.

References

External links

Populated places in Liège Province